Muhamed Kreševljaković (16 July 1939 – 5 December 2001) was a Bosnian politician who served as the Mayor of Sarajevo from December 1990 until April 1994. He was mayor when the Bosnian War broke out in 1992 and for the first two years of the Siege of Sarajevo.

Family
Kreševljaković was the son of Hamdija Kreševljaković, a historian, and Razija (née Ćorović). His paternal grandfather Mehmed (died 1929), was the son of Ibrahim Kreševljaković.

Mayor of Sarajevo (1990–94)
Kreševljaković was elected Mayor of Sarajevo in the December 1990 elections.

Siege of Sarajevo
American writer Susan Sontag gained attention for directing a production of Samuel Beckett's Waiting for Godot in a candlelit Sarajevo theatre in the city, that Kevin Myers in the Daily Telegraph called "mesmerisingly precious and hideously self-indulgent." Myers wrote, "By my personal reckoning, the performance lasted as long as the siege itself." However, many of Sarajevo's besieged residents disagreed:To the people of Sarajevo, Ms. Sontag has become a symbol, interviewed frequently by the local newspapers and television, invited to speak at gatherings everywhere, asked for autographs on the street. After the opening performance of the play, the city's Mayor, Muhamed Kreševljaković, came onstage to declare her an honorary citizen, the only foreigner other than the recently departed United Nations commander,  Lieut. Gen. Phillippe Morillon, to be so named.

"It is for your bravery, in coming here, living here, and working with us," he said.

References

1939 births
2001 deaths
Bosniaks of Bosnia and Herzegovina
Bosnia and Herzegovina Muslims
Mayors of Sarajevo
Politicians of the Federation of Bosnia and Herzegovina
Social Democratic Party of Bosnia and Herzegovina politicians
University of Sarajevo alumni
Politicians of the Bosnian War